The Sleeping Beauty is a 1930 Soviet drama film directed by Georgi Vasilyev and Sergei Vasilyev, their first feature film.

The main themes of the film are the conflict between old art forms such as ballet and the revolution and the need for creating new, proletarian forms of art.

Cast
 Konstantin Mukhutdinov as worker Rebrov
 Varvara Myasnikova as Vera
 Nikolay Simonov as worker
 Ivan Chuvelev

References
.

External links

1930 films
Soviet silent feature films
Lenfilm films
Films directed by Sergei Vasilyev
Soviet black-and-white films
Soviet drama films
1930 drama films
Silent drama films
1930s Russian-language films